Chrysocrambus craterellus is a species of moth of the family Crambidae. It was first described by Giovanni Antonio Scopoli in his 1763 Entomologia Carniolica.

Subspecies
Chrysocrambus craterellus craterellus (Central and Southern Europe, Urals, Transcaucasus, Asia Minor) 
Chrysocrambus craterellus alpinus Bleszynski, 1958 (France)
Chrysocrambus craterellus abruzzellus Bleszynski, 1958 (Abruzzi, Italy)
Chrysocrambus craterellus stachiellus (Toll, 1938) (Podolia, Ukraine)
Chrysocrambus craterellus libani Bleszynski, 1958 (Lebanon)
Chrysocrambus craterellus defessellus (Toll, 1947) (Iran)

Description
Chrysocrambus craterellus has a wingspan of about 20 mm. Wings are yellowish and characterized by a few longitudinal brown lines, with two transversal brownish lines close to the apex. The moth flies from June to July depending on the location. The larvae feed on Festuca and other Gramineae species.

Distribution and habitat
This species can be found in southern Europe and the Middle East. It prefers meadows, pastures and grasslands.

References

Crambinae
Moths described in 1763
Moths of Europe
Moths of Asia
Taxa named by Giovanni Antonio Scopoli